Disfigurehead is the first 7" EP by Memphis indie rock band the Grifters. The band was still a trio and the dynamics were not dissimilar from their A Band Called Bud incarnation, except that the production was more polished and the effects were toned down so that the guitars had a rougher edge.

Shangri-La Records re-released the first two Grifters singles in 1996 as The Doink Years 10" and again on CD in 2006.

Track listing

Album credits

Grifters
 Tripp Lamkins
 David Shouse
 Scott Taylor

References

Grifters (band) albums
1990 EPs